Joaquin Damaso Luna de San Pedro y Novicio Ancheta (December 11, 1864 – November 7, 1936) was a Filipino revolutionary and politician. He was a colonel during the Philippine Revolution, senator (1916–1919), governor of La Union (1904-1907), governor of Mountain Province (1916, 1920-1925), and representative of La Union's 1st District (1910–1916).

Personal life
Joaquin Luna was born on December 11, 1864. Brother to painter Juan Luna, violinist Manuel Luna, and General Antonio Luna, his parents were Don Joaquin Luna de San Pedro y Posadas and Doña Laurena Novicio y Ancheta.

Career

He was involved in the Philippine Revolution and served with the rank of colonel. Afterwards, he was La Union's representative to the Malolos Congress. La Union would later declare him as an adopted son years later. During the American occupation, he forwarded a collaborative stance and became associated with the group Asociacion de Paz as its treasurer that sought to establish cooperation with the colonizers by disengaging from anti-American revolt.

By 1904, he became governor of La Union and the representative of La Union's 1st legislative district during the 2nd and 3rd Philippine Legislature from 1910 until 1916.

When he was appointed governor of the Mountain Province in 1916, succeeding E.A. Eckman, he was the first Filipino to hold such position. In the same year, he became Senator for the 12th senatorial district for the 4th Philippine Legislature that included Baguio, Mountain Province, Nueva Vizcaya, and then Department of Mindanao and Sulu.

Through the Act of the Philippine Legislature No. 2623 that he authored and introduced in the Congress, he created the Conservatory of Music in the University of the Philippines on February 4, 1916.

References

1864 births
1936 deaths
20th-century Filipino politicians
Governors of Mountain Province
Members of the House of Representatives of the Philippines from La Union
People of the Philippine–American War
People of the Philippine Revolution
Senators of the 4th Philippine Legislature